The Cincinnati Park Board (officially the Cincinnati Board of Park Commissioners) maintains and operates all city parks in Cincinnati, Ohio. The board receives its funding from the city, state and federal grants, as well as private endowments. In 1932 the Cincinnati Zoo was purchased by the city and placed under the management of the board.

See also
 List of parks in Cincinnati
 Great Parks of Hamilton County
 Anderson Township Park District

References

External links
 

 
Government of Cincinnati